The British Independent Film Awards 2018 were held on 2 December 2018 to recognise the best in British independent cinema and filmmaking talent from United Kingdom. The nominations were announced on 31 October 2018. The Favourite led the nominations with 13, followed by American Animals with 11.

Winners and nominees

Films with multiple nominations and awards

References

External links
Official website

2018 film awards
British Independent Film Awards